Elise Hove Thorsnes (born 14 August 1988) is a Norwegian footballer who plays as a forward for Vålerenga and the Norwegian national team.

Club career
Thorsnes was born in Leikanger. She made her debut for the former elite team Kaupanger, and stayed there until her debut for Arna-Bjørnar in 2006. Thorsnes made her debut at the same time as Erika Skarbø, Madeleine Giske and Trude Johannessen. Arna-Bjørnar finished in 5th place in 2006. Thorsnes was the top scorer in the Toppserien with 19 goals, and was named Young Player of the Year, and was named to the 2006 Toppserien Team of the Year. The 2007 season was less successful for Thorsnes as she only scored 6 goals and Arna-Bjørnar finished in 4th place.

In the 2008 season Thorsnes scored 14 goals in the Toppserien, she also scored 11 cup goals in 10 cup games. She helped Arna-Bjørnar to a 5th-place finish and scored against all the top teams (apart from Røa).  On 12 December, Thorsnes revealed that she would be signing with Røa.

Thorsnes won two championships in her first three seasons in Røa. In 2011, she was the Toppserien's Golden Boot for the second time with 27 goals, a personal record.

Following the 2012 season, Thorsnes signed with Stabæk. In the 2013 season Thorsnes won the Golden Boot for the third time, scoring 19 goals. Stabæk finished in first place in the Toppserien and won the Norwegian Cup.

After two seasons with Stabæk, Thorsnes joined Avaldsnes where she would play for three seasons. In 2017 Thorsnes became the all-time leading goal scorer in the Toppserien.

In October 2017, Thorsnes joined Canberra United for the 2017–18 W-League season, meaning she would play club football outside of Norway for the first time. Thorsnes scored six goals in nine games with Canberra.

On 14 February 2018 Thorsnes signed with the Utah Royals of the NWSL for their inaugural season. This was a disappointing stint for Thorsnes as she only appeared in nine games, and didn't score any goals. After the season ended Utah declined her contract option, she was placed on Re-Enty wires and wasn't claimed by another team.

In November 2018, Thorsnes signed a one-year contract with Toppserien Champions LSK Kvinner for the 2019 season. In 2019 Thorsnes went to Canberra United as a guest player for the season, after she is finished there she is going back to her former club Avaldsnes.

International career
In 2006 Thorsnes made her debut for Norway Women's National Team, but she was not included in the squad for the 2007 Women's World Cup. Thorsnes scored her first goal for Norway against Italy at the 2008 Algarve Cup. In 2008 Thorsnes was named to the Norwegian Team for the Beijing Olympics, she appeared in three matches. Norway lost to Brazil in the Quarter-finals.

She scored her second international goal in the Quarter-finals of the 2009 European Championships, helping Norway defeat Sweden 3–1. Thorsnes participated in the 2011 World Cup. She appeared in all three group games for Norway, and scored a goal in Norway's final game, a 2–1 loss to Australia. Norway finished third in their group and did not advance to the knockout round.

At the 2013 European Championships Thorsnes appeared in every game for Norway as they advanced all the way to the Championship game, where they lost to Germany 1–0.

Thorsnes appeared in her second World Cup in 2015. She played in all four games for Norway, who were eliminated in the Round of 16 by England. Norway had a very disappointing European Championship in 2017, as they lost all three group games and failed to score a goal. Thorsnes started two games.

Thorsnes appeared in six games for Norway in World Cup Qualification, she scored one goal. Norway won their qualifying group and qualified for the 2019 World Cup.

International goals

Career statistics

Honours

Club
Røa
 Toppserien: 2009, 2011
 Norwegian Cup: 2009, 2010

Stabæk
 Toppserien: 2013
 Norwegian Cup: 2013

Avaldsnes 
 Norwegian Cup: 2017

Individual
 Toppserien Golden Boot: 2006 (19 goals), 2011 (27 goals), 2013 (19 goals)

References

External links
 

1988 births
Living people
People from Leikanger
Norwegian women's footballers
Norway women's international footballers
Norwegian expatriates in Australia
Expatriate soccer players in Australia
Toppserien players
Arna-Bjørnar players
Røa IL players
Stabæk Fotball Kvinner players
Avaldsnes IL players
Canberra United FC players
2011 FIFA Women's World Cup players
2015 FIFA Women's World Cup players
Utah Royals FC players
National Women's Soccer League players
FIFA Century Club
Women's association football forwards
2019 FIFA Women's World Cup players
Sportspeople from Vestland
UEFA Women's Euro 2017 players